Peru–Turkey relations are foreign relations between Peru and Turkey. Peru has an embassy in Ankara since 2010. Turkey has an embassy in Lima since 2010.

Presidential Visits

Economic Relations

Trade volume between the two countries was US$250 million in 2019 (Turkish exports/imports: 177.4/72.6 million USD).

See also 
 Foreign relations of Peru
 Foreign relations of Turkey
 List of ambassadors of Peru to Turkey
 List of ambassadors of Turkey to Peru

References 

 
Turkey
Bilateral relations of Turkey